Siccia punctipennis is a moth in the  family Erebidae. It was described by Wallengren in 1863. It is found on the Comoros, Madagascar and the Seychelles and in South Africa.

References

Natural History Museum Lepidoptera generic names catalog

Moths described in 1863
Nudariina